Van-Cove School District or Van-Cove Public Schools was a school district headquartered in Cove, Arkansas. It served Cove and Vandervoort.

It operated Van-Cove Elementary School in Vandevoort, and Van-Cove High School in Cove.

On July 1, 2010, that district consolidated with the Wickes School District into the Cossatot River School District.

References

Further reading
 (Download)

External links
 

Defunct school districts in Arkansas
2010 disestablishments in Arkansas
School districts disestablished in 2010
Education in Polk County, Arkansas